"Night Owl" is a song by Gerry Rafferty. It is the second track on his 1979 album of the same name. It features a Lyricon solo played by "Baker Street" saxophonist Raphael Ravenscroft. The song made the top five in the UK Singles Chart, and along with "Baker Street" is one of two solo efforts by Gerry Rafferty to accomplish this feat.

Though the single was a top-five hit for Rafferty in his native United Kingdom, "Night Owl" was never released in this format in North America, at a time when interest in Rafferty was at its peak after the success of his single "Baker Street" and album City to City a year earlier. In the US, "Days Gone Down" was used as the lead single from Night Owl instead.

The B-side on the original "Night Owl" single was the fourth track from the same album, "Why Won't You Talk To Me".

Charts

Certifications

References

1979 singles
1979 songs
Gerry Rafferty songs
Songs written by Gerry Rafferty